Novara Football Club, commonly referred to as Novara, is an Italian football club based in Novara, Piedmont.

The club was founded in 2021 by the City of Novara to replace old Novara Calcio that lost its professional status.

History
In December 1908 the F.A.S. (Football Association Studenti) was created by eight students of Liceo Carlo Alberto, aged between 15 and 16 years; among them an engineer, Gianni Canestrini, and a lawyer, Piero Zorini. In Novara in those days, there were other small clubs like Voluntas, Pro Scalon, Ginnastica e Scherma, Forza & Speranza, Collegio Gallarini and many other student bodies. The best players from these teams came together to form Novara Calcio, and made their debut in the Italian league on 3 November 1912.

The first match was played against a team already then established as Torino, who won 2–1.

In the years between World War I and World War II, Novara challenged with Pro Vercelli, Alessandria and Casale to make the so-called "quadrilatero piemontese" (Piedmont Quadrilateral). Novara played a Coppa Italia final against Inter Milan in 1939. Novara's highest finish came in 1952 when they finished in eighth place in Serie A.

During these years of staying in the top flight, Novara had Silvio Piola to thank. His many goals (which at the end of his career was over 300), made a huge contribution to the cause of Novara.  Following his death in 1996, the stadium at which Novara play was dedicated in his name.

In 1956 came relegation to Serie B, and another five years afterwards, they slipped down to Serie C due to a fraudulent complaint by a Sambenedettese player.

A few successful seasons in Serie B followed, but then Novara stumbled again in 1977 with relegation to Serie C and worse in 1981 to Serie C2. In the 1995–96 season, Novara were back in Serie C1, but this joy was short-lived as the following year, the biancoazzurri again had to deal with relegation.

Years were spent in the shadows of Italian football until more recently when the league was won in the 2002–03 season.

From Serie C1 to Serie A

Consolidation in Serie C1 followed, later becoming Lega Pro Prima Divisione, until the
historic promotion of the 2009–10 season where the club returned to Serie B after 33 years.

On 12 June 2011, Novara remarkably secured its promotion to Serie A after a 55-year absence from the league, by defeating Padova in the play-off final. Both consecutive promotions were achieved under the tenure of head coach Attilio Tesser, who was confirmed as Novara boss also for the following 2011–12 top flight campaign.

On 20 September 2011, the first home game in Serie A for 55 years, Novara recorded an historic 3–1 victory over Inter.

This remarkable feat, however, was not representative of their season as Novara managed to win only one more game until the end of January, when it won again against Inter in San Siro. The manager Attilio Tesser was replaced by veteran coach Emiliano Mondonico and re-hired one month later in a desperate and ultimately vain attempt by the owners to save the club from relegation. The club was immediately relegated again to Serie B after one season.
Novara finished 5th in 2012–13 season but were eliminated by Empoli in the promotion play-offs. The following season was terrible for Novara as the club finished 19th in Serie B and lost in a play-out against Varese, losing 4–2 on aggregate. Thus, Novara were relegated to Lega Pro. Novara were crowned as champions of Group A of Lega Pro in 2014–15 and immediately returned to Serie B. In their first season back in Serie B they finished in a playoff spot but they lost to eventual winners Pescara in the semifinal. The following season saw them finish outside the playoffs in 9th, 4 points from a playoff spot. The following season saw Novara get relegated back to Lega Pro following a 20th-place finish in the 2017–18 Serie B.

During the summer of 2021, Novara lost its professional status and a phoenix club was founded in Serie D according to article 52 of FIGC's regulations NOIF. They were promoted back to Serie C in May 2022, after finishing top of their group in Serie D.

Current squad

Out on loan

Managers

 Ferenc Molnár (1931–32)
 Árpád Weisz (1934–35)
 Evaristo Barrera (1956–58)
 Carlo Parola (1969–74)
 Bruno Bolchi (1978–79)
 Angelo Domenghini (1989–90)
 Luigi Delneri (1992–94)
 Franco Colomba (1994–95)
 Alberto Marchetti (1999)
 Giuliano Zoratti (1999–00)
 Luciano Foschi (2002–04)
 Antonio Cabrini (2005–06)
 Attilio Tesser (2009–12), Emiliano Mondonico (2012), Attilio Tesser (2012)
 Alfredo Aglietti (2012–13)
 Alessandro Calori (2013–14)
 Alfredo Aglietti (2014)
 Marco Baroni (2015–16)
 Roberto Boscaglia (2016–17)
 Eugenio Corini (2017–18)
 Domenico Di Carlo (2017-18)
 William Viali (2018-19)
 Giuseppe Sannino (2018-19)
 William Viali (2018-19)
 Simone Banchieri (2019-20)
 Simone Banchieri (2020-21)
 Michele Marcolini (2020-21)
 Simone Banchieri (2020-21)

Marco Marchionni  (2021-22)
 * Franco Semioli (2022-23)

Honours

League
 Serie B
 Winners: 1926–27, 1937–38, 1947–48
 Serie C
 Winners: 1964–65, 1969–70, 2009–10, 2014–15
 Serie C2
 Winners: 1995–96, 
 Serie D
 Winners: 2021–22

Cups
 Supercoppa di Serie C
 Winners: 2010, 2015

Divisional movements

References

External links
Novara FC website 

 
Football clubs in Italy
Football clubs in Piedmont and Aosta Valley
Association football clubs established in 1908
Italian football First Division clubs
Serie A clubs
Serie B clubs
Serie C clubs
Serie D clubs
1908 establishments in Italy
Phoenix clubs (association football)
2021 establishments in Italy